Lauciene parish is an administrative unit of Talsi Municipality, Latvia.

Towns, villages and settlements of Lauciene parish

See also 
 Nurmuiža Castle

Parishes of Latvia
Talsi Municipality